May the Devil Take You Too, also referred to as May the Devil Take You: Chapter Two, is a 2020 horror-fantasy film directed and written by Timo Tjahjanto. The sequel to the 2018 film May the Devil Take You and Tjahjanto has announced plans for a third installment in the series.

Synopsis
Two years have passed since the events in the last film, however Alfie is still experiencing paranormal phenomena. One day she and Nara are kidnapped and taken to an abandoned orphanage by a group of strangers introducing themselves as Leo, Marta, Kristi, Budi, Jenar, and Gadis. The group used to live at the orphanage and continued to even after its closing and the death of the owner's wife. They were abused by the owner, Ayub, who worshipped Moloch, prompting them to burn him alive in the home's cellar. Gadis insisted that his spirit was following and cursing them, however they didn't believe her until a seventh person in their group, Dewi, was killed in a supernatural fashion.

The group demands that Alfie come with them to the cellar and use a black bible to end the curse, aware that her father had used a similar one. Alfie reluctantly participates in the ritual, only for it to have the opposite effect and set Ayub's spirit free. The group is murdered one by one until only Budi, Marta, Leo, Alfie, and Nara remain. Alfie realizes that they were all tricked by Gadis, who had likely experienced Stockholm syndrome as a way of dealing with the abuse. She had faked her death by Ayub and had also killed Dewi. Gadis then kills Marta and Leo. Alfie faces off with Gadis, but is forced to use the black bible to effectively fight her. This has a temporary demonic impact on her body.

Gadis takes advantage of a lull in the fight to give herself over fully to Ayub and Moloch, resurrecting Ayub. He then tries to possess Budi, but is stopped by Alfie, who he then tries to possess. Knowing that she cannot allow him to take over her body, Alfie stabs herself in the heart, killing herself and Ayub. Her life is restored by Moloch, who says that she can only die in a way he sees fit and that suicide is an affront to him, as it is her acting like she owns her own soul. Alfie drives off with Budi and Nara. She knows that the fight is not over, but she now has an additional person on her side as well as the black bible.

Cast

Release
May the Devil Take You Too was released theatrically on February 27, 2020, followed by a release onto Disney+ Hotstar, both in Indonesia. It was released straight to video in the United States via Shudder on October 29, 2020.

Reception
Bloody Disgusting and Signal Horizon both commented that while the film uses familiar horror tropes, it does so effectively. The outlets both drew comparisons to Sam Raimi's Evil Dead and Signal Horizon noted a comparison to Joko Anwar's The Queen of Black Magic, which the reviewer felt was superior, though noting that Tjahjanto's movie "does have some genuinely revolting moments and more than a few laughs". The Daily Dead also reviewed the film and felt that the movie showed "a clear sense of growth in Tjahjanto’s directorial style between the first May the Devil Take You and its sequel, and while I definitely enjoyed the original film, the follow-up just totally goes balls to the wall with a reckless abandon, and I had a blast with what he does here."

References

External links
 

2020 films
2020 fantasy films
2020 horror films
Demons in film
2020s monster movies
Indonesian dark fantasy films
2020s Indonesian-language films
Shudder (streaming service) original programming
Indonesian horror films
Indonesian sequel films